Agron S. Haxhihyseni is a retired Albanian weightlifter. He won third place in the 1987 and 1989 European Weightlifting Championships in the now-defunct flyweight (52 kg) category.
In the 1990 He won the title European Master of Sport and in the 2015 Merit of Weightlifting (EWF). He broke over 50 national weightlifting records as an athlete and was a national champion for 10 years from 1975 to 1991.
In the 2005 He translated from Russian the boxing book How to be a Champion.
In the 2015 He published his book, The Albanian History of Weightlifting. 
Now he is General Secretary of Albanian Weightlifting Federation.

See also

 List of Albanians
 Sport in Albania

References

Date of birth missing (living people)
1971 births
20th-century Albanian sportspeople
21st-century Albanian sportspeople
Albanian male weightlifters
Living people
Sportspeople from Tirana
European Weightlifting Championships medalists